Uchechukwu N. Maduako  is a Nigerian politician and member of the 4th National Assembly and 5th National Assembly representing Isuikwuato/Umunneochi constituency of Abia State under the flagship of the People's Democratic Party.

See also
Nigerian National Assembly delegation from Abia

References

People from Abia State
Living people
Igbo politicians
Peoples Democratic Party members of the House of Representatives (Nigeria)
Year of birth missing (living people)